Pickerill is an English surname.

Notable people with this surname include:
 Cecily Pickerill (1903-1988), New Zealand surgeon
 Clive Pickerill (born 1956), English rugby player
 Henry Percy Pickerill (1879–1956), New Zealand surgeon
 Jenny Pickerill (born 1973), British environmental geographer
 Terrie Pickerill, American political strategist
 William Pickerill, also spelled William Pikerell, English academic

See also
 Pickerill Gas Field (sv) (ceb)